Hitbodedut or hisbodedus (lit. "seclusion, solitariness, solitude"; Tiberian: hīṯbōḏăḏūṯ , Ashkenazi: hīsboydedēs/hīsboydedūs or hīsbōdedūs, Sephardi: hitbōdedūt) refers to practices of self-secluded Jewish meditation.  The term was popularized by Rebbe Nachman of Breslov (1772–1810) to refer to an unstructured, spontaneous and individualized form of prayer and meditation through which one would establish a close, personal relationship with God and ultimately see the Divinity inherent in all being.

Background
Secluded meditation practices were encouraged by many medieval rabbis, such as Abraham Maimonides, Abraham Abulafia, Joseph Gikatilla, Moses de Leon, Moses Cordovero, Isaac Luria, and Chaim Vital.  The founder of Hasidism, the Baal Shem Tov, encouraged his close disciples to find deveikus through hitbodedut and by meditating on the kabbalistic unifications (yichudim) of Isaac Luria.

Rebbe Nachman of Breslov also wrote extensively about these practices and claimed that they were practiced by the forefathers of Judaism—Abraham/Avraham, Isaac/Yitzchak, Jacob/Yaakov, Moses/Moshe, David, the prophets, and their students—as well as the Torah leaders of each generation.

Rebbe Nachman's Method

The method involves talking to God in an intimate, informal manner while secluded in a private setting such as a closed room or a private outdoor setting.

The Rebbe Nachman of Breslov used to teach that one should spend a lot of time in solitude every day: during these moments, which would later turn into semi-prophetic or ecstatic experiences for the knowledge of God and the truth of the Torah, the devout Jew has more opportunities for Teshuvah, due to innovations in the knowledge of the Torah itself, in addition to being a specific meditative modality for personal prayers and being able to trust God as you would with a friend.

Rebbe Nachman taught that the best place for hitbodedut is in the forests or fields. "When a person meditates in the fields, all the grasses join in his prayer and increase its effectiveness and power," he wrote. He also suggested practicing hitbodedut in the middle of the night, when the desires and lusts of this world are at rest, although doing it during the day is just as effective.

During a session of hitbodedut, the practitioner pours out his heart to God in his own language, describing all his thoughts, feelings, problems and frustrations. Nothing was viewed by Rebbe Nachman as being too mundane for discussion, including business dealings, conflicting desires and everyday interactions. Even the inability to properly articulate what one wishes to say is viewed as a legitimate subject to discuss with God. One should also use the opportunity to examine his behavior and motivations, correcting the flaws and errors of the past while seeking the proper path for the future.

If one is absolutely unable to speak to God, then Rebbe Nachman advised saying one word with as much strength as possible. He taught that saying that word over and over again will eventually lead to a breakthrough; God will have compassion on the person and they will eventually be able to express themselves.

Rebbe Nachman told his leading disciple, Reb Noson, that hitbodedut should be practiced in a simple, straightforward manner, as if he were conversing with a close friend. He also advised:

"It is very good to pour out your thoughts before God like a child pleading before his father. God calls us His children, as it is written (Deuteronomy 14:1), "You are children to God." Therefore, it is good to express your thoughts and troubles to God like a child complaining and pestering his father."

Silent meditation
Hitbodedut also lends itself to certain silent meditation techniques. One is the "silent scream," which Rebbe Nachman himself practiced. He described the silent scream as follows:

You can shout loudly in a "small still voice"… Anyone can do this. Just imagine the sound of such a scream in your mind. Depict the shout in your imagination exactly as it would sound. Keep this up until you are literally screaming with this soundless "small still voice."

This is actually a scream and not mere imagination. Just as some vessels bring the sound from your lungs to your lips, others bring it to the brain. You can draw the sound through these nerves, literally bringing it into your head. When you do this, you are actually shouting inside your brain.

Another form of hitbodedut is called bitul (nullification), in which the practitioner meditates on God's presence to the exclusion of all other things, including oneself.

Hitbodedut is performed in one's mother tongue, in contrast to most other Jewish prayers that are recited in Hebrew. Rebbe Nachman did not intend for hitbodedut to take the place of the three daily prescribed Jewish services, but to supplement them. He recommended that his followers engage in hitbodedut for at least one hour each day.  

Hitbodedut is a staple practice for all Breslover Hasidim. The practice has been much publicized throughout Israel and the Jewish diaspora as a unique form of Jewish meditation, and is practiced by some Jews who are not Breslover Hasidim.

See also
Breslov (Hasidic dynasty)
Nachman of Breslov
Jewish meditation

References and note

Further reading
Bergman, Ozer (2006). Where Earth and Heaven Kiss: A Guide to Rebbe Nachman's Path of Meditation. Breslov Research Institute. .
Greenbaum, Avraham, trans. (1987). Tzaddik: A Portrait of Rabbi Nachman. Jerusalem: Breslov Research Institute. .
Kaplan, Rabbi Aryeh, trans. (1973). Rabbi Nachman's Wisdom. Jerusalem: Breslov Research Institute.
Kramer, Chaim (1989). Crossing the Narrow Bridge. Jerusalem: Breslov Research Institute. .
Sears, David (2002). The Tree That Stands Beyond Space: Rebbe Nachman on the Mystical Experience Breslov Research Institute. .

Breslov Hasidism
Hasidic thought
Jewish mysticism
Jewish prayer and ritual texts
Meditation
Kabbalistic words and phrases
Hebrew words and phrases in Jewish prayers and blessings